Raghuvarya Tirtha (1462 - 1557) was a Hindu philosopher, scholar, theologian and saint. He served as the pontiff of Shri Uttaradi Math from 1502-1557. He was the thirteenth in succession from Madhvacharya. According to tradition Sri Raghuvarya Tirtha taught the famous Nyayasudha of Jayatirtha seven times to his disciples.

Career

Meet with Chaitanya Mahaprabhu
According to Baladeva, Chaitanya Mahaprabhu accepted Sri Madhvacharya's theological position as true and in line with Vedanta. According to ninth chapter of Chaitanya Charitamrita - Madya-lila,  Chaitanya Mahaprabhu met Raghuvarya Tirtha in Udupi to discuss means and end of spiritual life and also about nine types of spiritual practices.

Works
Raghuvarya Tirtha composed many works but some of his extant works are Laghupariksa (or Raghupariksa) on nyaya, a commentary on Narayanapanditacarya's Prameyaratnamalika, Kṛṣṇastuti a devotional lyric in Kannada.

References

Bibliography
 

1557 deaths
Uttaradi Math
Vaishnavism
Vedanta
Dvaitin philosophers
Madhva religious leaders
16th-century Indian philosophers
Indian Hindu saints